Logone Oriental may refer to:
 Logone Oriental Prefecture
 Logone Oriental Region